Vítr v kapse is a Czech drama film written and directed by Jaroslav Soukup. It was released in 1982.

External links
 

Czech drama films
1980s Czech-language films
1982 films
1980s Czech films